The Bolivia women's national handball team is the national team of Bolivia. It is governed by the Federacion Boliviana de Handball and takes part in international handball competitions.

Results

South and Central American Championship

South American Games

Bolivarian Games

References

External links
IHF profile

Women's national handball teams
Handball